Zhanna Iosifovna Badoeva (née Dolgopolskaya, Долгопо́льская; born 18 March 1976) is a Ukrainian TV personality and producer. She is most known for being the host and onscreen moderator of the travel program “Oryol i Reshka”. In January 2023, Ukraine imposed sanctions on Zhanna for her support of 2022 Russian invasion of Ukraine.

Career on TV 
Badoeva is the first female resident of the popular show, Comedy Club U.A. She participated in the development of the following TV projects: “Dancing for you” on the channel 1+1, “Superstar”, “Sharmanka (Hurdy-gurdy)”, and “Lyalechka”. She conducted an acting technique course at the University of Culture.
In the year 2011, in cooperation with Yevgen Synelnykov and Elena Synelnykova, and with the help of Natella Krapivina, Badoeva has worked on the program “Oryol i Reshka”, on which Zhanna and her husband, Alan Badoev, acted as onscreen moderators. She left the project in 2012, after the conclusion of the third season, and was succeeded by Lesya Nikitjuk.

On February 8, 2015, the coverage of a jubilee 10th season of the program “Oryol i Reshka” commenced, and Zhanna Badoeva participated in the show together with her colleagues. In November 2017 it was revealed that Zhanna would come back to participate in an episode of the “stars” season.

On March 5, 2015, on the TV channel “Pyatnitsa!” a debut of the show “Beauty Salons Battle” occurred, which Zhanna Badoeva hosted for the first and the second season.
In September 2015, Badoeva introduced her new show “#ZhannaPozheny” or (ZhannaMarryusoff), also on “Pyatnitsa”. The concept of the show was to demonstrate various types of marriages, which Badoeva had arranged and organized in different locations around the world. This project was subsequently terminated.

In 2016 Zhanna was filmed for the program “Dangerous gigs”. Vladimir Petrov, also known as Vova-the-Meat, together with Zhanna Badoeva, explored the realities of European marginal life.

On October 17, 2016, Zhanna presented her debut shoe collection ZHANNA BADOEVA, in cooperation with a well-known Italian designer Ernesto Esposito and in 2017 launched an online store. 

In 2017, Zhanna Badoeva acted as a host of her auteur project “ZhannaPomogy” (or “ZhannaHelp”). The program aimed to help girls who felt insecure with themselves choose real-life relations over online dating.

In 2018, Zhanna Badoeva participated in the program “Oryol i Reshka, Russia” with Ida Galich. During the production of the Russian season, Zhanna has participated in 8 episodes that were filmed in Kazan, Krasnodar, Astrakhan, Kaliningrad, Caucasian Spas, Krasnoyarsk, Vladivostok and Yakutsk.

Personal life 
Badoeva was born in Mažeikiai town, Lithuanian SSR, USSR. 

In 1996 she married Igor Kurachenko and the pair had a son, Boris. Badoeva and Kurachenko divorced in 1998.

In 2003 Badoeva married Alan Badoev, with whom she had previously worked with. Together, they had a daughter, Lolita, and have gotten divorced in 2012.

In 2013 Zhanna moved to Italy with her children.

In 2015 Badoeva married Vasily Melnichyn, a Ukrainian businessman based in Italy.

Sanctions 
In January 2023 Ukraine imposed sanctions on Zhanna Badoeva for promoting Russia during the 2022 Russian invasion of Ukraine.

TV projects 

 “Oryol i Reshka” (“Inter”. “Pyatnitsa!”) a program host (seasons 1–3, 10);
 “MasterChef Ukraine” (STB) a jury panel member (2nd season);
 “Beauty salons battle” (“Pyatnitsa!”) a program host;
 “#ZhannaPozheny” (“Pyatnitsa!”) a program host;
 “Dangerous gigs” (“Pyatnitsa!”) a program host;
 “ZhannaPomogy” (“Pyatnitsa!”) a program host.

Notes

References 
 Zhanna Badoeva: husband put me out on the street!
 Zhanna Badoeva Biography
 Zhanna Badoeva – host of the program “Heads and Tails”
 “Heads and Tails”: Zhanna Badoeva: Once again I changed my life”
 The former host of the program “Heads and Tails” Zhanna Badoeva married in secrecy?

1976 births
Living people
Russian television presenters
Ukrainian television presenters
Women
Ukrainian women television presenters
Russian women television presenters
Ukrainian producers
Ukrainian directors